Andre Jay Green (born 26 July 1998) is an English professional footballer who plays as a forward for Slovan Bratislava in the Slovak Super Liga. He has represented England from under-16 to under-20 level.

Club career

Aston Villa
Green joined Aston Villa at the age of nine and progressed through the club's academy. He made his club and Premier League debut on 13 March 2016, coming off the bench for Jordan Veretout in a 2–0 loss to Tottenham Hotspur. In doing so, he became the fifth youngest player to ever represent the club, behind only Jimmy Brown, Rushian Hepburn-Murphy, Gareth Barry and Jonathan Bewers.

Following Aston Villa's relegation the season before, Green was linked with a move to a host of Premier League clubs but opted to sign a new three-year contract with Aston Villa in August 2016. Green made his first league start for the club at home against Preston in January 2017. He scored his first of 2 total goals (40 appearances), for Aston Villa against Norwich City on 19 August 2017.

Loan to Portsmouth
After struggling with an injury that kept him out of much of the 2017–18 season, Green found it difficult to get into the Aston Villa first team, and on 29 August 2018, he signed for Portsmouth on a season-long loan, dropping down a division to League 1. He scored his first of 2 total goals for Portsmouth in an EFL Trophy tie against Tottenham Hotspur Under 23s on 13 November 2018. On 5 January 2019, Green scored a last minute winner as Portsmouth won 1–0 to upset EFL Championship leaders Norwich City FC in the FA Cup third round at Carrow Road.
On 17 January 2019, Green was recalled from his loan spell.

Return to Aston Villa 
In January 2019, Green was recalled to Aston Villa. Portsmouth manager Kenny Jackett said that he believed that new Villa coach Dean Smith wanted to increase the quota of homegrown players in the squad. His first appearance back was against Hull City in a 2–2 draw. Green scored the third goal in a comeback against Sheffield United at Villa Park, Sheffield United had a 3–0 lead with 8 minutes, plus injury time remaining – before Villa scored three goals in quick succession with Green scoring in injury time.

Loan to Preston North End 

On 1 August 2019, Green joined Championship side Preston North End on a season-long loan deal. On 13 August 2019, Green scored his first goal for the club on his first team debut against Bradford City in the EFL Cup.

Loan to Charlton Athletic 

On 2 January 2020, Green joined Championship side Charlton Athletic on a loan until the end of the 2019–20 season. Green scored his first goal for Charlton in a 2–1 away defeat to Preston North End. 

On 25 June 2020, it was announced that Green would be released by Aston Villa, signing a contract extension with them to allow him to complete his loan spell at Charlton.

Sheffield Wednesday
On 14 January 2021, he joined Sheffield Wednesday, signing an 18-month contract. He would make his debut in a FA Cup game against Everton, where he would only play the opening half of the match.

Slovan Bratislava
On 19 August 2021, Green was named in the Slovan Bratislava squad registered on the UEFA website for a Europa League tie against Olympiacos. He did not travel with the club to their away leg of the game - but Sheffield Wednesday confirmed later that night that Green had joined the Slovak Super Liga side for an undisclosed fee.

Green made his Fortuna Liga debut on 22 August 2021, in a 1–0 away victory over Sereď. He scored his first goal for the club on 26 August 2021, in a 2–2 Europa League draw to Olympiacos. He would score his first career hattrick in a 7–0 cup victory over Jednota Malinec. On 3 April 2022, Slovan defeated Spartak Trnava to effectively seal the Slovak Super Liga title, Green's first major trophy. Green stated that this justified his decision to leave England and pursue a career in Slovakia.

International career
Green has represented England up to Under 20 level.

Career statistics

Honours
Aston Villa Under-23s

 Premier League Cup: 2017–18

Aston Villa
EFL Championship play-offs: 2019

Slovan Bratislava
Slovak First Football League: 2021–22
Slovak Cup Runner-Up: 2022

References

External links

England profile at The FA

1998 births
Living people
English footballers
England youth international footballers
Association football forwards
Aston Villa F.C. players
Portsmouth F.C. players
Premier League players
Black British sportsmen
Place of birth missing (living people)
Sportspeople from Solihull
English Football League players
Preston North End F.C. players
Charlton Athletic F.C. players
Sheffield Wednesday F.C. players
English expatriate footballers
English expatriate sportspeople in Slovakia
ŠK Slovan Bratislava players
Slovak Super Liga players